Last Days in the Desert is a 2015 American drama film directed and written by Rodrigo García. The film stars Ewan McGregor, Tye Sheridan, Ciarán Hinds and Ayelet Zurer.

Last Days in the Desert premiered at the 2015 Sundance Film Festival on January 25, 2015 and was released in the United States on May 13, 2016.

Plot 
Jesus walks through the desert, while stopping to pray and asking where God is. He encounters an old woman to whom he gives water, before noticing she has a snake tail, and she laughs at him.

Throughout the film, Satan appears to Jesus, adopting his appearance. He offers Jesus water, but Jesus doesn't reply. Eventually, Jesus finds a boy taking care of his mother in a tent. The boy is building a home with his father for him to live, although he wishes to go to Jerusalem. The mother is dying, since she cannot eat. The father gives food to Jesus, but he refuses, saying he is fasting. Jesus leaves, but soon returns and works with them to build the house, while he stays at his tent. Satan poses as the mother, wanting Jesus to believe that the boy is product of an infidelity.

Satan reveals to Jesus that he can see the future, and that the world is one more iteration of history, which God always tries again while changing some details. Satan reveals that whenever Jesus intervenes, he cannot predict the outcome. Jesus asks Satan what it is like to be in God's presence, and Satan explains an abstract feeling, while saying God has no face. Later, Satan adopts the figure of the naked mother, and tells Jesus that he is weak.

The boy develops a taste in inventing riddles, which Jesus enjoys. His father discovers a red rock (possibly ruby) in a cliff and plans to lower the boy with ropes while he and Jesus hold him, so he can get it. The boy refuses, and the father attacks him. Jesus offers himself to be the one to descend, but the father does it, while Jesus and the boy hold him. The father falls and demands the rope to be cut and falls into a chasm. Jesus and the boy go to look for him, but he dies from his injuries.

Jesus returns with the body so the mother can see her husband one last time. Jesus and the boy later find the body being burned. The boy gets some of his father's ashes, and his mother tells him to leave her. The boy obeys, and Jesus demands that Satan show him the boy's destiny. Jesus watches it in a bowl of water, and smiles. He attempts to heal the mother, but she refuses. Jesus leaves to Jerusalem. On the way, Satan tells him that he is tired of walking, and that in his final moments he will offer Jesus help. He tells Jesus to say hello to God when he sees Him.

The film jumps to Jesus' crucifixion. Dying, Jesus sees a hummingbird in front of him. The apostles then bury Jesus' body and stay outside of his tomb.

In the present day, two tourists take pictures in the same desert Jesus walked in.

Cast 
 Ewan McGregor as Jesus (Yeshua) and Satan
 Tye Sheridan as Son
 Ciarán Hinds as Father
 Ayelet Zurer as Mother

Production 
On February 1, 2014, the cinematographer Emmanuel Lubezki told Deadline Hollywood that he was going to work on a film in the desert with his friend Rodrigo García and Ewan McGregor. He said "It's a tiny little beautiful, extraordinary script that Rodrigo wrote that we’re going to shoot for five weeks." On February 5, 2014 two actors, Ewan McGregor and Tye Sheridan, joined the film cast. McGregor plays the dual roles of a holy man and a demon. The film is written and directed by Rodrigo García, while Division Films and Mockingbird Pictures produced the film. Ayelet Zurer and Ciarán Hinds play the roles of Sheridan's character's parents. The film premiered at the 2015 Sundance Film Festival. The movie was shot at Anza-Borrego Desert State Park in the Colorado Desert of Southern California.

The film was awarded the Dolby Family fellowship, a grant that allows filmmakers to finish their sound design and mix in Dolby Atmos. Sound Designers and Re-recording mixers J.M. Davey and Zach Seivers completed the original sound design and mix as well as the Dolby Atmos remix. Skip Lievsay, who won the Academy Award for Best Sound for his work on Gravity, served as a mentor to Davey and Seivers for the Atmos remix.

Reception

The review aggregator website Rotten Tomatoes reported that 77% of critics have given the film a positive review based on 70 reviews, with an average rating of 6.69/10. The site's critics consensus reads, "Last Days in the Desert offers enough stately grandeur and spiritual exploration to offset an occasionally ambiguous narrative." On Metacritic, the film achieved an average score of 67 out of 100 based on 20 reviews, signifying "generally favorable reviews".

References

External links 
 
 

Films directed by Rodrigo García
Films produced by Bonnie Curtis
Division Films films
American adventure drama films
Films about Christianity
Films based on the New Testament
Films set in deserts
Portrayals of Jesus in film
American Zoetrope films
2015 drama films
2015 films
2010s English-language films
2010s American films